Dominican Vudú, or Dominican Voodoo, popularly known as Las 21 Divisiones (The 21 Divisions), is a heavily Catholicized syncretic shamanistic religion of African-Caribbean origin which developed in the erstwhile Spanish colony of Santo Domingo on the island of Hispaniola.

Beliefs
Las 21 Divisiones, or "The 21 Divisions" of Dominican Voodoo, consists of three main "Divisions", and an annexed extra: Rada Division, also known as the "White", or "Sweet Division", whose spirits are of African origin (usually Fon, Ewe, and Nago spirits);  the Petro Division, also known as the "Fire", or "Bitter Division" (mostly of Bantu origin spirits); the Gede Division, also called the "Black Division" (whose spirits deal with death and the ancestors); and lastly the "Indian Division" (Indios), also called the "Water Division", whose spirits are of pre-Columbian origin (usually refers to the Taíno Indians—the indigenous spirits of the island of Ayiti). Most spirits are syncretized with a Catholic saint's image. These are some of the main features that distinguishes "Dominican Vudú" from other forms of Voodoo. Some major deities venerated in Dominican Vudú include:

Anaisa Pye, the Loa of love and happiness. She is syncretized with St. Anne, mother of Mary.  Her feast day is July 26.
Belie Belcan, the Loa of justice and protection against demons. He is syncretized with St. Michael, the Archangel. His feast day is September 29.
Candelo sé Difé, Loa of fire, also a warrior and protector spirit. Considered to be one of the Ogou, syncretized with St. Charles Borromeo. His feast day is November 4.
Santa Marta Dominadora, or Filomena Lubana, the Loa responsible for dominion over men. She is syncretized with St. Martha. Her feast day is July 29.
Ogun Balenyo, the Loa of warriors and soldiers. He is syncretized with Santiago (St. James). His feast day is July 25.
Baron, the Loa of death. He is syncretized with San Elías (St. Elijah). His feast day is November 2.
Metresili, the Loa of love, beauty, and wealth. She is syncretized with the Mater Dolorosa (Our Lady of Dolors).

Music 
Dominican Vudú music uses Afro-Caribbean percussion, mostly it is played with drums popularly known as Atabales or Palos, which are of Kongo origin; along with it a Guira (metal scraper). The drummers are known as Paleros, the ceremonies which they perform are usually referred to as Fiesta de Palo or Maní. Some of the most popular artists to record this music are Enerolisa Nuñez and Bembesito.

Characteristics 

Dominican Vudú is practiced through a "Tcha-Tcha" (Maraca—which means "rattle") lineage. In Haiti, Voodoo has come about and become more popular through another lineage known as the "Asson". However, before the "Asson", the "Tcha-Tcha" lineage was the prominent lineage in Haiti. Thus the "Tcha-Tcha" lineage is one of the oldest lineages within the Voodoo tradition all over the island.

Dominican Vudú practitioners are often called Caballos ('Horses'), Brujos ('Witch doctors'),  or Servidores ('Servants'), but they are also known as Papa Bokos and Papa Loa (priest); and Mama Mambos and Mama Loa (priestess). One who has obtained this title has gone through the last and highest level of initiation that can take anywhere between three and nine days and nights as well as have spent a time working for the community.

Differences with Voodoo of Haiti
Dominican Vudú is less uniform in comparison to the popularly known Haitian Vodou lineage called "Asogwe". There is much regional variation in the Dominican Republic and parts of Haiti, one will still surely find a base structure throughout the island that defines and connects all lineages. Altars or shrines range from shacks, to compounds, or even dedicated temples. There are also variations in how ceremonies are conducted or how the Caballos ('Horse of the spirit') may mount a specific Loa. Differences depend on lineage and or region of practice no matter if in Haiti or the Dominican Republic. It is said that Voodoo on the island is a big tree with many branches.

References

Externsl links
 Malas Vibras En Casa & Como Quitarlas (21 divisiones)

 
Afro-Caribbean religion
Afro-Dominican (Dominican Republic)
Dominican Republic culture
Religion in the Dominican Republic
Voodoo